The  vinous-breasted myna or vinous-breasted starling (Acridotheres leucocephalus) is a species of starling in the family Sturnidae.

It is found in Thailand, Laos, Cambodia, and Vietnam.

References

Acridotheres
Birds described in 1870
Birds of Thailand
Taxa named by Tommaso Salvadori